Gregory William Hudson (born February 4, 1967) is an American college football coach and former player. He is a former defensive coordinator for the Notre Dame Fighting Irish football team. He has also served as a defensive assistant at Minnesota, Cincinnati, Connecticut, East Carolina, Purdue and the linebackers coach at Florida State.

College career
Hudson played college football at Notre Dame, where he played linebacker. Hudson was also a catcher on the Fighting Irish baseball team.

Coaching career
Hudson was named the defensive coordinator at Purdue University in January, 2013. His salary was $395,000 annually. In 2016, Hudson joined the University of Notre Dame football team as a defensive analyst. On September 25, 2016, Hudson was named interim defensive coordinator at Notre Dame, following the firing of defensive coordinator Brian VanGorder.

Statistics
Team defensive statistics where Hudson was defensive coordinator.

References

1967 births
Living people
American football linebackers
Baseball catchers
Cincinnati Bearcats football coaches
Minnesota Golden Gophers football coaches
East Carolina Pirates football coaches
Florida State Seminoles football coaches
Notre Dame Fighting Irish baseball players
Notre Dame Fighting Irish football coaches
Notre Dame Fighting Irish football players
Purdue Boilermakers football coaches
Redlands Bulldogs football coaches
UConn Huskies football coaches
Players of American football from Cincinnati
Baseball players from Cincinnati